Waiohau or Waiōhau is a rural valley in the Whakatāne District and Bay of Plenty region of New Zealand's North Island, north of Murupara and south of Lake Matahina.

The Waiōhau Marae, located on the eastern boundary of Te Urewera National Park, is a traditional meeting ground for the hapū of Ngāti Haka and Patuheuheu, of the iwi of Tūhoe. It connects ancestrally to Te Urewera, the maunga (mountain) of Hikurangi and the awa (river) of Rangitaiki.

The wharenui (meeting house), Tama ki Hikurangi, was built between 1870 and 1909.

A new wharekai (dining hall) opened at the marae in March 2015. Jacinda Ardern was originally expected to open the building, but was unable due to other commitments. Fellow Labour MPs Peeni Henare, Tāmati Coffey and Kiritapu Allan attended in her place, and Ardern committed to visit at a later date.

History

The first education in Waiohau was provided by Presbyterian missionaries. A school opened in Waiohau in May 1918.

A memorial was installed at the school after World War II, honouring the 28th Māori Battalion soldier Paora Rua, who was killed in Crete on 23 May 1941. It features a painted wooden carving of a soldier, a concrete obelisk, a carved flag pole and two marble plaques. One is inscribed with the words: "In memory of Paora Rua, killed in action, Crete, May 23rd 1941, aged 28." The other reads: "By this memorial remember and honour Paora Rua, who died for his country."

As of 1956, the community consisted of about 200 members of Patuheuheu, living peacefully with a small number of Pākehā. It had four churches, including large Ringatū and Presbyterian churches. Many arts and crafts were still being passed on between generations, including the skills of whakairo.

A bronze plaque was added to school's war memorial during its jubilee celebrations in April 1968, acknowledging the original gift of land for the school.

Ngāti Manawa restricted access to the valley during the 2020 coronavirus pandemic.

Education

References

Whakatane District
Populated places in the Bay of Plenty Region
Valleys of New Zealand